The following list sorts all cities (including towns and villages) in the Japanese prefecture of Mie with a population of more than 5,000 according to the 2015 Census. As of October 1, 2015, 27 places fulfill this criterion and are listed here. This list refers only to the population of individual cities, towns and villages within their defined limits, which does not include other municipalities or suburban areas within urban agglomerations.

List 

The following table lists the 27 cities, towns and villages in Mie with a population of at least 5,000 on October 1, 2015, according to the 2015 Census. The table also gives an overview of the evolution of the population since the 1995 census.

References 

Mie Prefecture cities